Jesiah (also Ishiah, Ishijah, Isshiah, Isshijah, Jeshaiah) is a name found in the Bible. The Hebrew form of the name is yishshayah (in one case yishshayahu), meaning "man of Jah." The Bible contains five figures by this name.
Jesiah son of Izrahiah, son of Uzzi, son of Tola, son of Issachar, found in a genealogy of the Tribe of Issachar.
Jesiah, a Korahite and member of the Tribe of Benjamin, listed among the warriors who came to David at Ziklag.
Jesiah, leader of the "sons of Rehabiah," a Levite in the time of David.
Jesiah, son of Uzziel, son of Kohath, son of Levi. This Jesiah is recorded as being the father of Zechariah.
Jesiah, one of the "descendants of Harim," found in a list of men who took foreign wives in the time of Nehemiah.

References

Set index articles on Hebrew Bible people